is a semimonthly seinen manga magazine published in Japan by Shōnen Gahōsha, aimed primarily at adult male audiences. It is the sister publication of Monthly Young King and Young King OURs and was founded in 1987 as the sister publication of the now-discontinued Shōnen King. As of 2008, the circulation was about 230,000.

Manga artists and series featured in Young King
Masao
 Ishida & Asakura
Hiroshi Tanaka
 Bad Boys
Yasuyuki Ōno
 Yume no Kayoiji
Yuji Shiozaki
 Battle Club
Ooi Masakazu
 Okusan - Oh! My Sweet Honey!!
Satoshi Yoshida
 Shin Shōnan Bakusōzoku Arakure Knight (Bomber Bikers of Shonan)
Boichi
 Sun-Ken Rock 
Toshinori Sogabe
 Go! Tenba Cheerleaders
 Deban desu yo? Kondō-san!
Katsu Aki
 Harem Revolution
 Daddy * Virgin
Takashi Sano
 Iketeru Futari
 Usagi-chan de Cue!!
Shohei Harumoto
 Kirin (ongoing)
 Hi! Hi! Hi!
Q-taro Hanamizawa
 Tsuki Suzuran Doori
 Momoiro Sango (The Pink Coral)
 Play!
Masahiro Shibata
 Sarai
Hiromasa Okushima
 Akira No. 2 
Yū Yūki, Sō
 Comical Psychosomatic Medicine (ongoing)
Yūichi Katō
 Yancha Gal no Anjou-san (ongoing)

Related magazines
Young King OURs
Young Comic

References

External links
  
 

Semimonthly manga magazines published in Japan
Seinen manga magazines
1987 establishments in Japan
Magazines established in 1987
Shōnen Gahōsha